St Dionysius' Church, Market Harborough is a Grade I listed parish church in the Church of England in Market Harborough, Leicestershire.

History

The earliest parts of the church date from the 13th century, with most features dating from 14th and 15th centuries. Part of the tower was destroyed in a storm in 1735 and the replacement was several feet shorter. Restoration work was carried out in 1857 when the pews of 1751 were cut down in height to about 3 ft and the organ moved from the west gallery to a specially constructed recess. The church reopened on 8 January 1858. In 1887 the chancel and south aisle were re-roofed, and in 1951 the nave roof was replaced.

Organ

The pipe organ was moved in 1857 and later replaced with a new instrument by J Porritt of Leicester. This was opened on 9 August 1877.  Modifications were made in 1914. A specification of the organ can be found on the National Pipe Organ Register.

Organists
Herrap Wood 1882 - 1914 (formerly organist of St James' Church, Standard Hill Nottingham)

Bells

There are ten bells in the belfry. Eight of the bells were recast in 1901 and two new bells were added in 1990.

References

Church of England church buildings in Leicestershire
Grade I listed churches in Leicestershire
Market Harborough